
Gmina Rząśnik is a rural gmina (administrative district) in Wyszków County, Masovian Voivodeship, in east-central Poland.

Villages
Gmina Rząśnik contains the villages and settlements of Bielino, Dąbrowa, Gołystok, Grądy Polewne, Grodziczno, Janowo, Józefowo, Komorowo, Nowa Wieś, Nowe Wielątki, Nowy Lubiel, Nury, Ochudno, Osiny, Ostrówek, Plewica, Porządzie, Rogóźno, Rząśnik, Stary Lubiel, Wielątki, Wielątki-Folwark, Wincentowo, Wola Polewna, Wólka Lubielska, Wólka-Folwark, Wólka-Przekory and Wólka-Wojciechówek.

Neighbouring gminas
Gmina Rząśnik is bordered by the gminas of Brańszczyk, Długosiodło, Obryte, Rzewnie, Somianka, Wyszków and Zatory.

References

Polish official population figures 2006

Rzasnik
Wyszków County